Cooper Hewitt may refer to:

Peter Cooper Hewitt (1861-1921), American electrical engineer, inventor of the mercury-vapor discharge lamp
Cooper Hewitt, Smithsonian Design Museum, a museum of the Smithsonian Institution dedicated to design
Cooper Hewitt Laboratory from Albert Potter Wills